Radwan Karout (born 25 March 1950) is a Syrian former wrestler who competed in the 1980 Summer Olympics.

References

1950 births
Living people
Olympic wrestlers of Syria
Wrestlers at the 1980 Summer Olympics
Syrian male sport wrestlers
Place of birth missing (living people)
20th-century Syrian people